Anil Kaushik is an Indian National Congress Politician from Navi Mumbai, Maharashtra, India. He is an ex-deputy mayor of Navi Mumbai Municipal Corporation. He has been appointed as the Navi Mumbai Congress President in 2018.

Positions held
 2018: Elected as President of Navi Mumbai Regional Congress Committee
 2002: Elected Deputy Mayor of Navi Mumbai Municipal Corporation

References

Indian National Congress politicians from Maharashtra
Marathi politicians
Maharashtra politicians
Living people
People from Navi Mumbai
Year of birth missing (living people)